The 1896 Furman Baptists football team represented Furman University as an independent during the 1896 college football season. Led by Frank Sims in his first and only season as head coach, Furman compiled a record of 2–3.

Schedule

References

Furman
Furman Paladins football seasons
Furman Baptists football